Aléxia Zuberer (born 1972) is a Swiss-French ski mountaineer, ski instructor and mountain guide, and took also part in several Himalayan expeditions.

Selected results 
 1998:
 1st, Tour du Rutor (together with Claudine Trécourt)
 2nd, Patrouille des Glaciers together with Claudine Trécourt and Jana Heczková)
 2001:
 1st, Trophée des Gastlosen (European Cup, together with Gloriana Pellissier)
 1st, Trofeo Mezzalama (together with Gloriana Pellissier and Arianna Follis)
 3rd, European Championship team race (together with Gloriana Pellissier)
 2002:
 1st, Transacavallo (together with Gloriana Pellissier)
 1st, Dolomiti Cup team (together with Gloriana Pellissier)
 2nd, Trophée des Gastlosen (together with Gloriana Pellissier)

Pierra Menta 

 1995: 2nd, together with Claudine Trécourt
 1997: 1st, together with Claudine Trécourt
 1998: 1st, together with Claudine Trécourt
 1999: 3rd, together with Véronique Lathuraz	
 2000: 1st, together with Gloriana Pellissier
 2001: 1st, together with Gloriana Pellissier
 2005, 8th, together with Sylvie Ferragu

Expeditions 
 1996 : Cho Oyu - Tibet
 1997 : Shishapangma - Tibet
 2002 : Ama Dablam - Nepal
 2003 : Everest - Nepal
 2007 : Everest - Tibet (without oxygen up to )
 2008 : Mustagh Ata - China
 2010 : Makalu-Nepal with the Mountains-6 Makalu 2010 expedition, first Swiss woman to reach the summit.
 2011 : Kangchenjunga India/Nepal

Publications 
 Pierra Menta - Traces d'une Légende, 2005
 Double ascension à l'Everest, Nevicata Editions, 2008. .

References 

1972 births
Living people
Swiss female ski mountaineers
French female ski mountaineers